The masu salmon (Oncorhynchus masou), also known as masu or  in Japan, is a species of salmon belonging to the genus Oncorhynchus, found in the North Pacific along Northeast/East Asian coasts from the Russian Far East (Primorsky, Kamchatka Peninsula, Sakhalin and Kuril Islands) to south through Korea, Japan and Taiwan.

A number of subspecies are known, including the widespread nominate subspecies yamame (O. m. masou), the critically endangered Formosan salmon (O. m. formosanus) found in certain landlocked freshwater systems of Taiwan, the Biwa trout (O. m. rhodurus) endemic of Lake Biwa, and the anadromous or stream-dwelling amago (O. m. macrostomus) restricted to western Japan.

Appearance

A masu salmon which has reached sexual maturity has a darkened back, and the stripes on the body sides become bright red with crimson tinge to merge on the abdomen into one common longitudinal band of lighter color. For this reason, it was given the name cherry salmon.

Life cycle

Like other Pacific salmon, its life cycle is subdivided into marine and freshwater periods; in rivers, this species lives from 1 to 3 years and can form living freshwater forms. The sea lifecycle, depending on the age of the young, continues for 2.0 to 3.5 years. In the sea, the masu salmon feeds intensely on crustaceans, less often on young fish. On attaining sexual maturity, in its third to seventh years of life, it enters rivers to spawn. Its spawning run starts earlier than that of other salmon species.

After spawning, most passing fish die, and those that remain alive (preferentially dwarf males) participate in spawning the next year, too. Emerging from the nest, the young do not travel to the sea immediately, but remain in spawning areas, in the upper reaches of rivers, and on shallows with weak currents. The young move to pools and rolls of the river core to feed on chironomid, stone fly, and may fly larvae, and on airborne insects. The masu salmon travels to the ocean in its second, or occasionally even third year of life.

Economic importance

This salmon, like most others, is a highly commercial species caught in fisheries, raised for aquaculture, and sought after as a game fish. It is marketed fresh and frozen and is often eaten broiled or baked.

Subspecies and morphs

 O. m. masou — masu salmon, anadromous (sea-run) form
 O. m. ishikawae (synonym) — also called , a non-anadromous (landlocked), black-spotted form (or a synonym of O. m. macrostomus, red-spotted)
 O. m. var. iwame — Iwame trout, recessive spotless form
 O. m. rhodurus — Biwa trout, in Lake Biwa of western Japan 
 O. m. macrostomus — , red-spotted masu salmon; endemic to western Japan
 O. m. formosanus — Formosan salmon, landlocked form endemic to Taiwan

References

Oncorhynchus
Fish of the Pacific Ocean
Vertebrates of East Asia
Marine fauna of Asia
Taxa named by J. Carson Brevoort
Fish described in 1856
Salmon